Iris Tabeling (born 27 June 1991) is a Dutch badminton player. She is a women's doubles and mixed doubles specialist.

Achievements

European Junior Championships 
Girls' doubles

BWF Grand Prix 
The BWF Grand Prix had two levels, the Grand Prix and Grand Prix Gold. It was a series of badminton tournaments sanctioned by the Badminton World Federation (BWF) and played between 2007 and 2017.

Women's doubles

  BWF Grand Prix Gold tournament
  BWF Grand Prix tournament

BWF International Challenge/Series 
Women's doubles

Mixed doubles

  BWF International Challenge tournament
  BWF International Series tournament
  BWF Future Series tournament

References

External links 

 
 Iris Tabeling Websites

1991 births
Living people
Sportspeople from Amstelveen
Dutch female badminton players
21st-century Dutch women